The Roman Catholic Diocese of Parañaque (Latin: Dioecesis Paranaquensis; Filipino: Diyosesis ng Parañaque; Spanish: Diócesis de Parañaque) is a diocese of the Latin Church of the Roman Catholic Church in Metro Manila, Philippines which encompasses the cities of Parañaque, Las Piñas, and Muntinlupa. Previously belonging to the Archdiocese of Manila, the Ecclesiastical District of Parañaque (formerly, PPLM) was declared an independent diocese on December 7, 2002, by Pope John Paul II by virtue of the papal bull Ad Efficacius. The district bishop, Jesse Eugenio Mercado, also one of the auxiliary bishops of Manila, was designated as its first and only bishop and was formally installed on January 28, 2003.

The diocese comprises 50 full-fledged parishes (four of which are pronounced diocesan shrines, 3 of which are national shrines), 2 quasi-parishes, and 1 non-parochial shrine. The Diocesan Shrine of Nuestra Señora del Buen Suceso de Palanyag – Saint Andrew Cathedral-Parish in La Huerta, Parañaque serves as the episcopal see of the diocese.

Creation of the Diocese 
On December 7, 2002, Pope John Paul II erected the Diocese of Parañaque through the Apostolic Constitution Ad efficacius, upon the recommendation of Cardinal Jaime Sin and consultation with the Catholic Bishops' Conference of the Philippines. The Apostolic Nuncio, Archbishop Antonio Franco, endorsed this request to the Congregation for Bishops, and it was considered and approved by the Pope.

It effectively carved the cities of Parañaque, Las Piñas, and Muntinlupa from the Archdiocese of Manila. The diocese thus became a suffragan of the archdiocese, with the Archbishop of Manila as its metropolitan archbishop. The parish of Saint Andrew was raised to the rank and dignity of a Cathedral being the see of Parañaque. The parish was oldest in the area, thus given the honor to be the see of the bishop and the city where it stands became eponymous to the diocese.

Jesse Mercado was appointed bishop of the diocese on the day of its establishment, and installed to be the first bishop of the Diocese of Paranaque on January 28, 2003.

At the time of its erection, the Diocese of Parañaque which has 126.50 square kilometers, has a population of 1,381,000, of which 1,269,122 were Catholics, with 48 parishes, 46 diocesan priests, 87 religious priests, 87 male religious institutes, 61 female religious institutes, 382 educational institutions and 35 charitable institutions.

Statistics
As of 2019, the total population within the territory of the diocese was 1,857,355, of whom 1,476,597 were Catholics.

There diocese has 50 parishes. Three of them, Baclaran Church, National Shrine of Mary Help of Christians in Parañaque, and the National Shrine of Our Lady of the Miraculous Medal in Muntinlupa, have been declared National shrines. Four are Diocesan Shrines. There are four quasi-parishes and two chaplaincies ministered to by the clergy, grouped in six vicariates: three in Parañaque, two in Las Piñas and one in Muntinlupa.

Coat of arms of the Diocese
The miter symbolizes the pastoral authority of the bishop over the diocese, represented by the three divisions in the shield. On top is represented the first city within the diocese and its seat, Parañaque. It is symbolized by the crown with an "M" standing for the patroness of the city,  Nuestra Señora del Buen Suceso de Palanyag. In the middle is Las Piñas pictured by the internationally acclaimed Bamboo Organ housed in the parish of St. Joseph found in the said city. The third city of the jurisdiction of the diocese is Muntinlupa with the blazon of the small mountain near a body of water.

Red represents the Holy Spirit, and the blue, Mary. The gradation from red to blue is symbolic of the overshadowing of the Holy Spirit on Mary, thus the incarnation of Jesus (Luke 1:34). The movement from dark (color) to bright is the hope that through the episcopal ministry, the "dawn from on high shall break" (Luke 1:78) upon the people of God in the diocese.

Bishop of Parañaque
Since its creation, Jesse Eugenio Mercado has been the bishop of Parañaque.

Mercado was born on June 6, 1951, at Caloocan. He studied at St. Joseph School and completed his philosophical and theological formation at San Jose Seminary run by the Jesuits. After becoming a priest, he took his licentiate in theology at the Angelicum in Rome (1981–1984).

He was ordained to the priesthood on March 19, 1977, for the Archdiocese of Manila. There he served as assistant parish priest of San Isidro Parish, Pasay (1977), Spiritual Director at the San Pablo Regional Seminary, Baguio City (1977–1979), Director of the Pre-College Department of the  San Carlos Seminary, Makati City (1979–1981), Professor of Theology at the San Carlos Seminary (1985–1988), Rector of the Holy Apostles Seminary, Makati City (1988–1994), and Rector of the Pontificio Collegio Filippino in Rome (1994–1997).

He was named Titular Bishop of Talaptula and Auxiliary Bishop of Manila on February 25, 1997, and ordained on March 31 of the same year.

References

External links
 The Official Website of the Diocese of Parañaque 

Roman Catholic dioceses in the Philippines
Roman Catholic Ecclesiastical Province of Manila
Christian organizations established in 2002
Roman Catholic dioceses and prelatures established in the 21st century
2002 establishments in the Philippines
Parañaque